Cottus altaicus is a species of ray-finned fish belonging to the family Cottidae, the typical sculpins. It is endemic to western Siberia in Russia.  Its range includes the Irtysh River basin in the Altai region. It reaches a maximum length of 8.1 cm. It was previously considered a subspecies of the alpine bullhead (Cottus poecilopus).

References

Fish of Russia
Cottus (fish)
Fish described in 1899